Suneaters are an American psychedelic, rock and roll band formed in Kansas City, Missouri in 2008. The band members include Scott Hartley, Chris Lost, Michael Judd, and Nick Carroll. Suneaters’ debut LP “One” was released in October 2011 on Lotuspool Records, an independent record label started by Chris Lost in the early 1990s.  Suneaters advocate what they call a DIT (Do-it-together) culture – a variation on the DIY (Do-it-yourself) punk rock ethos.  DIT emphasizes collaboration, collective action, art sharing, and experimentation in fracturing the dominant music industry paradigms.

History
Suneaters blossomed from the quiet demise of Los Angeles, California glam rock band, Dr.Doctor, which began as a mere diversion, was directed by G, artist Mark Silverberg, and writer/actor Michael McMillian. Due to external artistic commitments, Dr.Doctor was unable to sustain its early mass and velocity. Chris Lost, returning to Kansas City from L.A., recruited Scott Hartley, a local Dadaist, to play bass, and David Saab, poet/attorney/raconteur, on drums, aspiring to reignite The Doctor’s flame.  This trio formed the nascent Suneaters.

After releasing "Suneaters I" in 2011, an experiment in pop and psychedelic noise "controlled" by their instruments, Suneaters recorded "Suneaters XIII" in 2012, a soundtrack for McMillian's short film, "Charlie 13". The band then focused on playing live, attempting to rely less on pedals/electronics for sound, honing their playing, and writing the stripped down, aspirationally yacht rock, love tribute, "Suneaters II: Loving Relationship". For this album released in 2015, Hartley and Lost recruited Chris Cardwell and Michael Judd.

To promote "Suneaters II: Loving Relationship", the band enlisted the filmmaking skills of W. Dave Keith to make a video version of the entire album. The film incorporated the directorial skills of Keith, Annie Walsh, Rachael Jane, Haley Chaffin, and Allison Flom.

Keeping with the trend of following ascending albums ("I", "II") with descending albums ("XIII"), Suneaters released "Suneaters XII: L’appel Du Vide" in 2017. This album was a compilation of twisted dance tracks Hartley created mostly with electronics.

Musical style and Philosophy
Suneaters cite as their primary musical influences SST Records, Led Zeppelin, Hanatarash, Flipper, INXS, Kool Keith, and Graham Nash. Suneaters purposefully eschew traditional live performance venues, opting instead to perform at events or unconventional locations such as leftist political rallies, knitting circles, flea markets, film festivals, tournaments, independent retail establishments, and meadows. Suneaters claim that nothing valuable can result from playing in the jaded and indoctrinated environment of the rock and roll club. The band claims this philosophy is largely a product of more than 25 years of Suneaters’ members participating in traditional club-playing bands.
 
Suneaters live performances are derivative of Allan Kaprow’s classic “happenings.” incorporating children, animals, direct audience confrontation, food, film, and prose.  They claim live actions to be the purest way to create an egalitarian DIT culture in which everyone and everything has discernible value and can contribute their art, whatever it may be.

Band members

Current members
 Scott Hartley – vocals, bass (2008–present)
 Chris Lost – vocals, guitar (2008–present)
 Michael Judd – vocals, guitar (2015–present)
 Nick Carroll – vocals, drums, percussion (2020–present)

Former members
 David Saab – vocals, drums (2008–2014)
 Chris Cardwell – vocals, drums, percussion (2015–2019)

Discography

 Suneaters I (2011)
 Suneaters XIII (2012)
 Suneaters II: Loving Relationship (2015)
 Suneaters XII: L’appel Du Vide (2017)
 Suneaters III: Unfathomable Darkness (2019)
 Suneaters XI: It's The Future (2020)

Timeline

References
 Tough, Paul. The Next Seattle. New York Times, 12/19/1993.
 Interview: Michael McMillian on Lucid. http://whatistechnoagain.com/, 09/26/2010
 PunkNews.org Streams: Suneaters: 'Suneaters II: Loving Relationship'''. http://www.punknews.org/article/57115/streams-suneaters-suneaters-ii-loving-relationship
 Entertainment Weekly The world's friendliest Satanist stars in Suneaters' 'Hey Bros!' video -- exclusive. http://www.ew.com/article/2015/03/26/worlds-friendliest-satanist-stars-suneaters-hey-bros-video-exclusive
 The Deli Kansas City Artist on Trial: Suneaters. http://kansascity.thedelimagazine.com/suneaters1
 The Pitch Suneaters are back with a brand-new album and music video, and you can stream both right here, right now''. http://www.pitch.com/FastPitch/archives/2015/06/01/suneaters-are-back-with-a-brand-new-album-and-music-video-and-you-can-stream-both-right-here-right-now

Rock music groups from Missouri
Musical groups established in 2002
2002 establishments in Missouri
Musical groups from Kansas City, Missouri